Rudnya may refer to:

in Belarus
Rudnya, Brest Voblast, a village
Rudnya, a former village in Belarus, now part of Aktsyabarski

in Russia
Rudnya, Russia, name of several inhabited localities in Russia